Naser Sara (also Romanized as Nāşer Sarā) is a village in Chini Jan Rural District, in the Central District of Rudsar County, Gilan Province, Iran. At the 2006 census, its population was 1,009, in 305 families.

References 

Populated places in Rudsar County